This is a list of airports in Wyoming (a U.S. state), grouped by type and sorted by location. It contains all public-use and military airports in the state. Some private-use and former airports may be included where notable, such as airports that were previously public-use, those with commercial enplanements recorded by the FAA or airports assigned an IATA airport code.

Airports

See also 
 Essential Air Service
 Wyoming World War II Army Airfields
 Wikipedia:WikiProject Aviation/Airline destination lists: North America#Wyoming

References 
Federal Aviation Administration (FAA):
 FAA Airport Data (Form 5010) from National Flight Data Center (NFDC), also available from AirportIQ 5010
 National Plan of Integrated Airport Systems for 2017–2021, updated September 2016
 Passenger Boarding (Enplanement) Data for CY 2016, updated October 2017

Wyoming Department of Transportation (WYDOT):
 Aeronautics Division
 FlyWyoming.org

Other sites used as a reference when compiling and updating this list:
 Aviation Safety Network – used to check IATA airport codes
 Great Circle Mapper: Airports in Wyoming – used to check IATA and ICAO airport codes
  Abandoned & Little-Known Airfields: Wyoming

  
 
Airports
Wyoming
Airports